Wenquan County as the official romanized name, also transliterated from Mongolian as Arixang County, is a county in the northwest of the Xinjiang Uyghur Autonomous Region and is under the administration of the Börtala Mongol Autonomous Prefecture, bordering Kazakhstan's Almaty Region to the north and west. According to the 2002 census, it has a population of 70,000.

Climate

References

County-level divisions of Xinjiang